Xestia distensa is a species of moth belonging to the family Noctuidae.

References

Xestia
Moths described in 1851